James McColl (14 December 1892 – 1978) was a Scottish footballer who played for Celtic, Hibernian and Stoke. McColl scored over 250 goals in the Scottish Football League, and was top scorer in the 1915–16 season with Celtic.

Career
McColl was born in Glasgow and played for Anderson Thornbank and St Anthony's before joining Celtic in 1913. He became a prolific scorer in the Scottish First Division helping the Bhoys team to win the title five times in his seven seasons at Celtic Park as well as a Scottish Cup in 1913–14.

He moved to Stoke in 1920–21 to try his luck in the English game but he struggled, scoring five goals in 27 matches, and at the end of the season returned to Scotland with Partick Thistle then Hibernian. He continued his goalscoring in the Scottish League and hit 143 goals in 320 matches for the Hibees, playing alongside another former St Anthony's forward Jimmy Dunn for several seasons. Despite his prolonged success and goalscoring prowess at club level, he was never chosen for the Scottish national team or any other representative select teams.

Career statistics

Honours
 Celtic
 Scottish Football League champions:  1913–14, 1914–15, 1915–16, 1916–17, 1918–19
 Scottish Cup: 1913–14
 Glasgow Cup: 1915–16
 Glasgow Merchants Charity Cup: 1913–14, 1914–15, 1916–17

 Hibernian
 Scottish Cup runner-up: 1922–23, 1923–24

See also
List of footballers in Scotland by number of league appearances (500+)
List of footballers in Scotland by number of league goals (200+)

References

External links
Jimmy McColl , www.ihibs.co.uk

1892 births
1978 deaths
Association football forwards
Celtic F.C. players
Hibernian F.C. non-playing staff
Hibernian F.C. players
Leith Athletic F.C. managers
Leith Athletic F.C. players
Peebles Rovers F.C. players
Scottish Football League players
Scottish football managers
Scottish footballers
Footballers from Glasgow
Stoke City F.C. players
Partick Thistle F.C. players
English Football League players
Scottish league football top scorers
St Anthony's F.C. players
Scottish Junior Football Association players